Asadhyulu ( Invincible Persons) is a 1992 Telugu-language psychological film, produced by K. V. Rao on Neo Art Creations banner and directed by Joemon. It stars Jagapathi Babu, Suresh, Shobana, Nirosha  and music composed by Ilaiyaraaja. The film was inspired by the English film Dream Team (1989).

Plot
The film revolves around a psychiatric center where Sridhar, Anand, Dr. Pratap, and Vinod are mental patients, and each of them is having their own individual story. Dr. Vyjayanthi newly appointed doctor becomes a good friend to the 4 of them. Once, Vyjayanthi takes them to a picnic on her assurance. On their return trip, Vyjayanthi witnesses an MLA Chidambaram, and his son Jagapathi slaying a CBI officer who holds a diary - containing the secrets of their illegal activities. Unfortunately, the diary goes into the hands of Vyjayanthi, and now they try to slaughter her too. The rest of the story is about how the 4 madmen protect their doctor.

Cast

Jagapathi Babu as Sridhar 
Suresh as Anand
Shobana as Jyothi
Nirosha as Dr. Vyjayanthi
Raghuvaran as Dr. Pratap
Sudhakar as Vinod
Pundarikakshaiah as M.L.A. Chidambaram
Rajesh as Jagapathi
Vidyasagar as Rocky
Vinod as Police Inspector
Prasad Babu as C.B.I. Officer
P. J. Sarma as Police Inspector 
Hema Sundar as Lata's uncle
Sivaji Raja as Suribabu
Chitti as Raja 
Kinnera as Lata
P. R. Varalakshmi as Jyothi's mother
Dubbing Janaki as Pratap's sister

Soundtrack

Music was composed by Ilaiyaraaja. Lyrics were written by Sirivennela Sitarama Sastry. Music released on ECHO Audio Company.

References

1992 films
Indian psychological thriller films
Films scored by Ilaiyaraaja
1990s Telugu-language films
1992 thriller films